The Papua New Guinea national cricket team toured the United Arab Emirates in March and April 2017 to play three One Day Internationals (ODIs), three Twenty20 Internationals (T20Is) and a first-class match. Two of the three ODI matches were part of the 2015–17 ICC World Cricket League Championship and the first-class match was part of the 2015–17 ICC Intercontinental Cup tournament. Before the international fixtures, Papua New Guinea played warm-up matches against the English sides Middlesex County Cricket Club and Yorkshire County Cricket Club.

The United Arab Emirates won the ODI series 2–1, after winnings the final match of the series by 103 runs. The UAE won the Intercontinental Cup match by a margin of 9 wickets, their first victory in a first-class match since 2013. The UAE won the T20I series 3–0.

Squads

ODI series

1st ODI

2nd ODI

3rd ODI

Intercontinental Cup match

T20I series

1st T20I

2nd T20I

3rd T20I

References

External links
 Series home at ESPN Cricinfo

2017 in Papua New Guinean cricket
2017 in Emirati cricket
Papua New Guinean cricket tours of the United Arab Emirates
International cricket competitions in 2016–17